Funk rock is a fusion genre that mixes elements of funk and rock. James Brown and others declared that Little Richard and his mid-1950s road band, The Upsetters, were the first to put the funk in the rock and roll beat, with a biographer stating that their music "spark[ed] the musical transition from fifties rock and roll to sixties funk."

Funk rock's earliest incarnation on record was heard in the late 1960s through the mid-1970s by acts such as the Jimi Hendrix Experience (later work / Band of Gypsys), Eric Burdon and War, Redbone, Rick Derringer, David Bowie, Aerosmith, Wild Cherry, Average White Band, Gary Wright, Trapeze, The Bar-Kays, Black Merda, Parliament-Funkadelic, Betty Davis and Mother's Finest. During the 1980s and 1990s funk rock music experienced a surge in popularity, with bands such as Tom Tom Club, Pigbag, INXS, Talking Heads, Devo, the Fine Young Cannibals and Cameo dabbling in the sound. Groups including Red Hot Chili Peppers, Rage Against the Machine, Incubus, Mr. Bungle, Primus and Faith No More also notably combined funk rock with metal, punk, hip hop and experimental music, leading to the emergence of the genre known as funk metal or "punk-funk."

Characteristics
Funk rock is a fusion of funk and rock. Many instruments may be incorporated into the music, but the overall sound is defined by a definitive bass or drum beat and electric guitars. The bass and drum rhythms are influenced by funk music but with more sonic intensity, while the guitar can be funk- or rock-influenced, usually with distortion, which is similar to overdrive or fuzz.

Genre history

1960s and 1970s
Jimi Hendrix was the first well-known recording artist to combine the rhythms and riffs of early funk with his rock sound. Perhaps the earliest example is his "Little Miss Lover" (1967). The live album Band of Gypsys features funky riffs and rhythms throughout (especially the songs "Who Knows" and "Power of Soul") and his unfinished album also included a couple of funk rock songs such as "Freedom", "Izabella" and "Straight Ahead."

George Clinton has been considered the godfather of this genre since 1970. Clinton created the name "P-Funk" for the innovative new concepts of funk that he culled from former members of James Brown's band (such as Maceo Parker, Bootsy Collins and Fred Wesley) and new young players such as Eddie Hazel. His groups, Funkadelic and Parliament, practically defined funk since the release of the influential funk rock Funkadelic classic Maggot Brain (1971). Later funk rock albums by the group include Cosmic Slop, Standing on the Verge of Getting It On, Hardcore Jollies and Let's Take It to the Stage. Later albums such as One Nation Under a Groove and Electric Spanking of War Babies had a bit more radio-friendly sound but still preserved much of group's funk rock approach. This work served as the primary influence on an entire generation of funk and hip hop artists from the Red Hot Chili Peppers to Snoop Dogg.

Other pioneers evolved in the 1970s in the form of British rock band Trapeze and post-punk act A Certain Ratio, and American artists Rick Derringer, Redbone, The Bar-Kays, Shotgun, Black Nasty and Mother's Finest. "We called ourselves funk rock," recalled Mother's Finest singer Glenn "Doc" Murdock. "I think we invented that. We even had a house where we all lived and we named it 'Funk Rock, Georgia.' We felt that we were headlining that whole genre. We played with Lynyrd Skynyrd and AC/DC. Those bands had a lot of funk in their music. The real problem for us was when we played in black clubs. They told us we were too loud."

Grand Funk Railroad pioneered the bass driven hard rock funk style in 1970 so well portrayed in their song "Inside Looking Out" and later picked up by Rage Against the Machine. Also singer-model Betty Davis recorded important funk rock albums. The iconoclast composer and guitarist Frank Zappa demonstrated the merge of styles in albums like Overnite Sensation, in themes such as "I'm the Slime", covered decades later by Funkadelic.

Funk rock acts were not favored by R&B recording companies. For example, guitarists of Chic wanted to be a glam funk rock band like Kiss, but they eventually became a disco act after being turned down by recording companies. Despite its considerable influence on later popular music, funk rock was not a very visible phenomenon during the 1970s. Only a few funk rock acts could be seen on record charts, notably David Bowie ("Fame" and Young Americans, 1975), Aerosmith ("Last Child", 1976), The Rolling Stones ("Hot Stuff", 1975), Ike & Tina Turner ("Nutbush City Limits", 1973), Gary Wright ("Love Is Alive", 1976) and Wild Cherry ("Play That Funky Music", 1976).

When Glenn Hughes left Trapeze and joined Deep Purple along with David Coverdale, Deep Purple's next two albums contained elements of funk and soul. When Ritchie Blackmore left Deep Purple in 1975, the band's next album Come Taste the Band with Tommy Bolin was even more funky than its predecessor Stormbringer. However, Deep Purple broke up in 1976 and Tommy Bolin died from a drug overdose. British guitarist Robin Trower's albums In City Dreams and Caravan to Midnight, produced by veteran R&B producer Don Davis and featuring former Sly & The Family Stone bassist Rustee Allen, are also pioneering funk rock albums. In the late 1970s Iggy Pop released Bowie-produced LP The Idiot.

1980s
From the start of the 1980s, funk musicians Ricky Sander, Ottenheim James, and Cameo as well as new wave band Blondie and post-punk band Talking Heads each created their own brand of funk rock. British rock group Queen had a major funk rock hit song of the period with "Another One Bites the Dust" (the beat was inspired by Chic's hit "Good Times"). Also in the 1980s, some synth-funk and synthpop bands such as Thomas Dolby, Scritti Politti, Howard Jones (hit with Things Can Only Get Better) made the basic funk beats along with elements of new wave which makes this a basic synth-funk song.

The funk rock genre's representatives from the 1980s to present day include INXS, the Fine Young Cannibals, Jane's Addiction, Fishbone, Faith No More, Living Colour and Terence Trent D'Arby.

With Prince leading the way, the Minneapolis sound greatly contributed to creating, expanding and defining the funk rock style, with Minnesota-based artists such as The Time, Morris Day, Jesse Johnson, Alexander O'Neal, Andre Cymone, The Family, St.Paul Peterson, Apollonia 6, Vanity 6, Brownmark, Mazarati and producers Jimmy Jam and Terry Lewis  all working in the funk rock genre.

Red Hot Chili Peppers's second and third albums (which were released 1985 and 1987 respectively, and featured guitarist Hillel Slovak) have been described as the more funk-oriented albums of their collection. This is often characterized by a driving bass-line which is played over a sparse guitar track occasionally punctuated by metal-like riffs and solos (such as the solo in the middle of "Backwoods").

1990s

Keziah Jones, Seal, and Stevie Salas released funk rock albums. And in the early 1990s, several bands combined funky rhythms with heavy metal guitar sounds, resulting in "funk metal," where the emphasis is in using much heavier distorted guitar sounds in the mix. Funk rock employs more of a lighter, "crunchier" distorted guitar sound, and the musical emphasis tends to be more beat-driven with prominent bass lines; more rhythmic in the R&B sense.

Lenny Kravitz is one of the most prominent musicians today in the fusion of rock riffs and funk rhythms, as exampled in tracks such as "Tunnel Vision," "Always on the Run," and "American Woman." Rock band Incubus's early sound was rooted in funk music, heavily influenced by earlier funk/metal fusion artists such as Faith No More and Primus. During the making of his acclaimed studio album Voodoo (2000), neo soul musician D'Angelo was influenced by the funk rock sound of P-Funk, Jimi Hendrix and other such artists, while his hit single "Untitled (How Does It Feel)" has been noted by critics for containing elements of and similarity to the Maggot Brain sound of Funkadelic. Jane's Addiction have included many funk based routines in tracks. Irish band Republic of Loose are also noted for their funk rock sound which has earned them several awards and critical acclaim.

In the late 90s, Vermont-based jam band Phish began incorporating funk influences into their sound, creating a style dubbed "cow funk". This style can be heard prominently on their 1998 release, The Story of the Ghost.

Some Britpop bands experimented with funk, mainly in terms of bass lines, including Blur.

2000s–present

In 2005, Defiance Douglass, a vocalist, musician, producer & songwriter (commonly known as "The Dark Soul of Funk/Rock"), formed Exiles of the Nation (also known as EOTN) in Atlanta, Georgia, with a new brand of art/psychedelic Funk/Rock titled "ExileMusik", which incorporates elements of other genres as well. Beginning in 2006, Exiles of the Nation have released 19 albums, the latest being 2022's "The Obstacle Curse". Defiance Douglass/Exiles of the Nation are also a part of the P-Funk collective. Their 2nd album released in 2008, "Escape From Trap City", is usually regarded as their most infamous. Their 2021 album, "Liquidation", also made the Top 10 of several "Best of 2021 Funk Albums" lists.

The wave of Britpop revival/baggy revival bands in the 2010s, such as Peace, experimented with funk. Peace's second album Happy People features numerous elements of funk, mainly in terms of basslines.

In 2010, a group called I Set The Sea On Fire formed in Sheffield, incorporating elements of funk and other genres into their music.

In 2014, Prince formed a new backing band, 3rdeyegirl. Their brand of funk rock was featured on their 2014 release, Plectrumelectrum.

See also
 Alternative rock
 Dance-rock
 Rap rock
 Psychedelic funk
 Psychedelic rock

Notes

Sources
 

 
Funk genres
Fusion music genres
American rock music genres